Burcott  may refer to:
 Burcott, Bierton, Buckinghamshire, England
 Burcott, Wing, Buckinghamshire, England
 Burcott, Somerset, England

See also
 Burcot (disambiguation)
 Burcote